John George Barry Bingham, 5th Baron Clanmorris DL, JP (27 August 1852 – 4 November 1916), was an Irish peer.

Bingham was the son of John Bingham, 4th Baron Clanmorris, by Sarah Selina, daughter of Burton Persse. His mother and grandmother were members of the Persse family, making him a cousin of Augusta, Lady Gregory. He was educated at Eton. In 1876, aged 23, he succeeded his father in the barony. This was an Irish peerage and did not entitle him to a seat in the House of Lords. Lord Clanmorris was an aide-de-camp to the Lord-Lieutenant of Ireland between 1876 and 1878 and served as a Deputy Lieutenant of County Mayo and as a Justice of the Peace for County Down and County Galway.

Lord Clanmorris lived mainly at Cregclare, Ardrahan, County Galway, though with addresses in Dublin, London and County Mayo. His Galway seats were Cregclare and Seamount. He owned over three thousand acres (12 km2) in Galway alone, and had paid nineteen thousand for a section of the Lambert family property. At the age of twenty-six he was registered a member of eight clubs across the United Kingdom, including gentleman's and yacht clubs.

Lord Clanmorris died at Bangor Castle, County Down, in November 1916, aged 64. He had married Matilda Catherine Maude, daughter of Robert Edward Ward of Bangor Castle, County Down, in 1878 and had seven sons and three daughters. Their third son the Honourable Edward Bingham was a Rear-Admiral in the Royal Navy. Lord Clanmorris was succeeded by his eldest son, Arthur. Lady Clanmorris died at Bangor Castle in February 1941, aged 82. One of his daughters, Ierne, married Herbert Lightfoot Eason in 1908 but died in 1917. Eason was later Vice Chancellor of the University of London.
Another daughter, Emily Ina Florence Bingham married Herbert Dixon 1st Baron of Glentoran

See also
Earl of Lucan

References

 Claregalway Parish History - 750 Years, Galway, 1999
 In Their Own Words: The Parish of Lackagh-Turloughmore and its People, ed. Liz Blackmore, John Cronin, Donal Ferrie and Brid Higgins, Galway, 2001. .

1852 births
1916 deaths
People from County Galway
Barons in the Peerage of Ireland
People educated at Eton College
Deputy Lieutenants of Mayo